Bailey Hodgson (born 5 September 2002) is an English professional rugby league footballer who plays as a  and  for the Newcastle Knights in the NRL.

He previously played for the Castleford Tigers in the Super League.

Background
Hodgson was born in Hull, England. He is the nephew of Parramatta Eels and English international  Josh Hodgson.

Playing career

2020
In 2020, Hodgson made his Super League début for Castleford Tigers (Heritage № 1002) in round 17 against Hull Kingston Rovers.

In November, Hodgson signed a 3-year contract with Australian side Newcastle Knights starting in 2021.

References

External links
Newcastle Knights profile
Castleford Tigers profile

2002 births
Living people
Castleford Tigers players
English expatriate rugby league players
English rugby league players
Rugby league fullbacks
Rugby league centres
Rugby league players from Kingston upon Hull